Mike Harmon (born July 24, 1961) is a former American football wide receiver. He played for the New York Jets in 1983.

References

1961 births
Living people
American football wide receivers
Ole Miss Rebels football players
New York Jets players